Doug Meacham (born December 16, 1964) is an American football coach. He played college football at Oklahoma State University, where he was an offensive lineman.

Meacham was hired by TCU to be their offensive coordinator on December 12, 2013. In his first year at TCU in 2014 he was a finalist for the Broyles Award.

Meacham was hired by David Beaty of the Kansas Jayhawks as the offensive coordinator on January 12, 2017. Meacham was fired on October 10, 2018.

In 2019, he joined the St. Louis BattleHawks of the XFL as offensive coordinator. He resigned in January 2020 to become the inside wide receivers coach for TCU.

References

External links
 TCU Horned Frogs bio

1964 births
Living people
American football offensive linemen
Henderson State Reddies football coaches
Houston Cougars football coaches
Jacksonville State Gamecocks football coaches
Kansas Jayhawks football coaches
Oklahoma State Cowboys football coaches
Oklahoma State Cowboys football players
Samford Bulldogs football coaches
St. Louis BattleHawks coaches
TCU Horned Frogs football coaches
Junior college football coaches in the United States
Sportspeople from Arlington, Texas
Players of American football from Texas